The Grammy Award for Song of the Year is an honor presented at the Grammy Awards, a ceremony that was established in 1958 and originally called the Gramophone Awards. The Song of the Year award is one of the four most prestigious categories at the awards (alongside Best New Artist, Record of the Year and Album of the Year), presented annually since the 1st Grammy Awards in 1959. According to the 54th Grammy Awards description guide, the award is presented: 

If a winning song contains samples or interpolations of existing material, the publisher and songwriter(s) of the original song(s) can apply for a Winners Certificate.

Song of the Year is related to but is conceptually different from Record of the Year or Album of the Year:

 Song of the Year is awarded for a single or for one track from an album. This award goes to the songwriter who actually wrote the lyrics and/or melodies to the song. "Song" in this context means the song as composed, not its recording.
 Record of the Year is also awarded for a single or individual track, but the recipient of this award is the performing artist, the producer, recording engineer and/or mixer for that song. In this sense, "record" means a particular recorded song, not its composition or an album of songs.
 Album of the Year is awarded for a whole album, and the award is presented to the artist, songwriter, producer, recording engineer, and mastering engineer for that album. In this context, "album" means a recorded collection of songs (a multi-track LP, CD, or download package), not the individual songs or their compositions.

History and description
The Song of the Year awards have been awarded since 1959. It is one of the four most prestigious Grammy Awards. Despite both the Record of the Year award and Song of the Year being awarded for a single or for one track from an album, this award goes only to the composer(s) of the song whereas the Record of the Year award goes to the performer(s) and production team for a particular recording of the song. According to the 54th Grammy Awards description guide, the award is given to the songwriter(s) of a song that "must contain melody and lyrics and must be either a new song or a song first achieving prominence during the eligibility year. Songs containing prominent samples or interpolations are not eligible".

Since the late 1960s other songwriter's awards have been presented for genre-specific categories, including Grammy Award for Best Country Song (since 1965), Grammy Award for Best R&B Song (since 1969), Grammy Award for Best Song Written for Visual Media (since 1988), Grammy Award for Best Rock Song (since 1992), and most recently Grammy Award for Best Rap Song (since 2004), Grammy Award for Best Gospel Song (from 2006 to 2014), Grammy Award for Best Contemporary Christian Music Song (from 2012 to 2014), Grammy Award for Best American Roots Song (since 2014), Grammy Award for Best Gospel Performance/Song (since 2015), and Grammy Award for Best Contemporary Christian Music Performance/Song (since 2015).

The category was expanded to include eight nominees in 2019 and 10 nominees in 2022.

As of 2023, a distinct category to honor songwriters was established: Songwriter of the Year, Non-Classical.

Achievements 

In many cases, the songwriters were also the performers (Domenico Modugno, Henry Mancini, John Lennon & Paul McCartney, Joe South, Paul Simon, Carole King, Barbra Streisand, Billy Joel, Michael McDonald, Christopher Cross, Sting, Michael Jackson & Lionel Richie, Bobby McFerrin, Eric Clapton, Bruce Springsteen, Seal, Shawn Colvin, Rob Thomas, U2, Alicia Keys, Luther Vandross, John Mayer, Dixie Chicks, Amy Winehouse, Coldplay, Beyoncé, Lady Antebellum, Adele, Fun, Lorde, Sam Smith, Ed Sheeran, Bruno Mars, Childish Gambino, Billie Eilish, H.E.R., Anderson .Paak, and Bonnie Raitt).

Dernst Emile II is the only songwriter to win Song of the Year in two consecutive years: in 2021 ("I Can't Breathe") and 2022 ("Leave the Door Open").

Other multiple winners in this category include Henry Mancini ("Moon River" and "Days of Wine and Roses"); Johnny Mercer ("Moon River" and "Days of Wine and Roses"); James Horner ("Somewhere Out There" and "My Heart Will Go On"); Will Jennings ("Tears in Heaven" and "My Heart Will Go On"); U2 ("Beautiful Day" and "Sometimes You Can't Make It on Your Own"); Adele ("Rolling in the Deep" and "Hello"); Christopher Brody Brown ("That's What I Like" and "Leave the Door Open"); and Bruno Mars ("That's What I Like" and "Leave the Door Open"), winning two times each.  However, songs written for Andy Williams, Roberta Flack, Barbra Streisand and Bette Midler have received this award twice.

Paul McCartney, Lionel Richie & Taylor Swift have the most Song of the Year nominations with six each. McCartney and Richie both won once, McCartney for "Michelle" and Richie for "We Are the World". Swift has never won it. 

The first woman to win the award was Carole King in 1972, for "You've Got a Friend". Adele was the first female songwriter to win the award twice, winning for "Rolling in the Deep" and "Hello".

Lorde is the youngest songwriter to win in the category, winning for "Royals" in 2014 at the age of 17.

Irving Gordon is the oldest songwriter to win the award, winning for “Unforgettable” in 1992 at age 77.

Christopher Cross and Billie Eilish are the only artists to receive the Grammys for Song of the Year as well as Record of the Year, Album of the Year, and Best New Artist in a single ceremony. Adele was the first artist to win the award for Song of the Year, Record of the Year, Album of the Year, and Best New Artist from separate occasions, and first woman to accomplish this feat. Only six artists have won the Song of the Year and Best New Artist awards the same year: Christopher Cross ("Sailing" in 1981), Alicia Keys ("Fallin'" in 2002), Amy Winehouse ("Rehab" in 2008), Fun ("We Are Young" in 2013), Sam Smith ("Stay with Me (Darkchild Version)" in 2015) and Billie Eilish ("Bad Guy" in 2020); Marvin Hamlisch is the only composer to win the Song of the Year and Best New Artist awards the same year in 1975, for "The Way We Were".

John Lennon, Paul McCartney, Lionel Richie, Diane Warren, Billie Eilish, H.E.R, and Finneas O'Connell are the only songwriters to receive three consecutive nominations for Song of the Year.

The song "Nel blu, dipinto di blu (Volare)", winner in 1959, written by Domenico Modugno and performed in Italian, is the only foreign-language song to win this award, although the 1967 winner "Michelle" penned by Lennon–McCartney for The Beatles to perform, has a critical part of its lyrics in French.

The Ernest Gold song "Theme of Exodus", which won in 1961, is the only instrumental song to ever receive this award.

The first and only tie in this category in Grammy history took place in 1978, when both Barbra Streisand's & Paul Williams' "Evergreen (Love Theme from A Star Is Born)" and Joe Brooks' "You Light Up My Life" won the award.

The first time in Grammy history that two different songs with the same title have been nominated in this category happened with "Hello" written by Lionel Richie in 1985 and "Hello" by Adele & Greg Kurstin in 2017.

The song with the most writers to win this award is "That's What I Like", which won in 2018 with eight writers. The song with the most writers nominated in this category is "Peaches", which was nominated for the 2022 ceremony with 11 co-writers.

Thirty-two of the winning songs have also won the award for Record of the Year.

Process
From 1995 to 2018, members of the National Academy of Recording Arts and Sciences nominated their choices for song of the year. A list of the top twenty records was given to the Nominations Review Committee, a specially selected group of anonymous members, who then selected the top five records to gain a nomination in the category in a special ballot. The rest of the members then vote a winner from the five nominees. In 2018, it was announced the number of nominated tracks would be increased to eight. In 2021, it was announced that the Nomination Review Committees would be disbanded, and the final nominees for song of the year would be decided by votes from members. Starting in 2022, the number of nominees in the category increased to 10.

Recipients
An asterisk (*) indicates this recording also won Record of the Year.

1960s

1970s

1980s

1990s

2000s

2010s

2020s

 Each year is linked to the article about the Grammy Awards held that year.
 The performing artist is only listed but does not receive the award.

Songwriters with multiple wins
2 wins
Adele
Bono
Brody Brown
Adam Clayton
D'Mile (consecutive)
The Edge
James Horner
Will Jennings
Henry Mancini
Bruno Mars
Johnny Mercer
Larry Mullen Jr.

Songwriters with multiple nominations

6 nominations
Paul McCartney
Lionel Richie
Taylor Swift

5 nominations
Burt Bacharach
Beyoncé
Jay-Z
John Lennon
Bruno Mars

4 nominations
Adele
Alan Bergman
Marilyn Bergman
Bono
Brody Brown
Sammy Cahn
Brandi Carlile
Adam Clayton
The Edge
Will Jennings
Billy Joel
Philip Lawrence
Hillary Lindsey
Max Martin
Larry Mullen Jr.
Ed Sheeran
Sting
Jimmy Van Heusen

3 nominations
Carole Bayer Sager
Jeff Bhasker
Justin Bieber
Hal David
D'Mile
Billie Eilish
Phil Hanseroth
Tim Hanseroth
Don Henley
H.E.R.
Michael Jackson
Alicia Keys
Greg Kurstin
Lady Gaga
Kendrick Lamar
Robert John "Mutt" Lange
John Legend
Ari Levine
Henry Mancini
Lori McKenna
Johnny Mercer
Finneas O'Connell
Tim Rice
Liz Rose
Paul Simon
Bruce Springsteen
Tricky Stewart
Jule Styne
Diane Warren
Paul Francis Webster
Kanye West
Paul Williams

2 nominations

Peter Allen
Ruby Amanfu
Jack Antonoff
Johntá Austin
Corinne Bailey Rae
Glen Ballard
Louis Bell
Benny Blanco
Leslie Bricusse
Mariah Carey
Tracy Chapman
Lauren Christy
Dave Cobb
Phil Collins
Christopher Cross
Neil Diamond
Dr. Luke
The-Dream
Fred Ebb
Graham Edwards
Eminem
Dino Fekaris
Barry Gibb
Robin Gibb
Norman Gimbel
Howard Greenfield
Marvin Hamlisch
Kuk Harrell
James Horner
Rodney Jerkins
Elton John
John Kander
Josh Kear
R. Kelly
Kris Kristofferson
Avril Lavigne
Michel Legrand
Lizzo
Barry Mann
Michael McDonald
Alan Menken
Julia Michaels
Anthony Newley
Freddie Perren
Linda Perry
Ricky Reed
Nate Ruess
Bobby Russell
Neil Sedaka
Shellback
Eddie Snyder
Stephen Sondheim
Sounwave
Joe South
Scott Spock
SZA
Tiara Thomas
Shania Twain
Jimmy Webb
Cynthia Weil
will.i.am
Stevie Wonder
Andrew Wyatt

See also 
Grammy Award for Record of the Year
Grammy Award for Best Country Song
Grammy Award for Best R&B Song
Grammy Award for Best Song Written for Visual Media
Grammy Award for Best Rock Song
Grammy Award for Best Rap Song
Grammy Award for Best Gospel Song
Grammy Award for Best Gospel Performance/Song 
Grammy Award for Best Contemporary Christian Music Song
Grammy Award for Best Contemporary Christian Music Performance/Song
Grammy Award for Best American Roots Song

References

General
  Note: User must select the "General" category as the genre under the search feature.
 

Specific

External links
 Official site

Song Of The Year
 
Songwriting awards